The Checkered Giant, known as Géant Papillon in French, is a breed of domestic rabbit that originated in France. One of the largest rabbit breeds, the Checkered Giant is recognized by the American Rabbit Breeders Association (ARBA). 

The Checkered Giant is one of the minority of rabbit breeds with specific coat markings. The markings defined in the breed standard of the Checkered Giant differ somewhat from those in the breed standard of the Giant Papillon. ARBA does not specify a maximum weight for Checkered Giants.

History
In 1904, Otto Reinhardt of Reinfalz, Germany interbread the Great German Spot and black Flemish Giant rabbit. Six years later, the Checkered Giant was introduced in the United States.

Appearance
For the Checkered Giant, ARBA recognizes two varieties: Black ("white with black markings"), and Blue ("white with gray markings"). Each sex and variety is judged separately.

See also

Domestic rabbit (includes rabbit health and care)
List of rabbit breeds

References

External links
American Checkered Giant Rabbit Club
American Rabbit Breeders Association
Checkered Giant Rabbit Breed History
House Rabbit Society

Rabbit breeds